Arthur Francis Nicholas Wills Hill, 9th Marquess of Downshire (born 4 February 1959), is a British peer in the peerage of Ireland and landowner in Yorkshire.

Early life

Downshire was born in 1959, the son of Robin Hill, 8th Marquess of Downshire. About 1970, his father bought the Clifton Castle estate, near Masham in North Yorkshire, which became the family's main home.

The young Hill studied farm management at the Royal Agricultural College, Cirencester, and went on to qualify as a chartered accountant. 

He was styled as Earl of Hillsborough after his father succeeded as Marquess of Downshire in 1989.

Career
Hill was with Touche Ross from 1981 to 1987 and spent some twenty years working in finance and venture capital in London. In 2001, he returned to Masham to take over from his father the management of the Clifton and Jervaulx estates. In 2003 he succeeded his father as Marquess of Downshire and inherited the estates. 

In 2013, Downshire inherited another peerage, that of Baron Sandys, from a distant cousin. 

In 2014, Downshire was farming some 700 acres of the Clifton Castle estate in hand. Some 250 acres were arable, growing mainly wheat, barley and oats. He had by then given up on a large dairying operation, which had proved to need too much new investment, but had diversified by creating biomass boilers and a hydro-electric power scheme. As well as quarrying and forestry interests, and ten tenanted farms on the two estates, Downshire also owned the Blue Lion pub at East Witton, named as "best dining inn" in the Good Pub Guide for 2014.

In March 2014 Downshire became chairman of the Country Landowners' Association in Yorkshire and also joined the policy committee of the national organization. He commented to The Yorkshire Post "Estate owning is a long-term business, and any decision I make is trying to look fifty years forward, rather than a few months."

In 2018 he became a member of the Council of the Duchy of Lancaster.

Personal life
Downshire married Diana Jane Bunting, daughter of Gerald Leeson Bunting, a solicitor, of Otterington House, Northallerton, and they have four children:
 Lady Isabella Diana Juliet Hill (born 1991)
 Lady Beatrice Hannah Georgina Hill (born 1994), married name Lady Georgina Anderson, a chef in Harrogate 
 Edmund Robin Arthur Hill, Earl of Hillsborough (born 1996) 
 Lady Claudia Lucy Helena Hill (born 1998)

The family lives mostly at Clifton Castle.

In June 2022 the Downshires opened the grounds of the castle as part of the National Garden Scheme in Wensleydale.

Notes

1959 births
Alumni of the Royal Agricultural University
Living people
Hill family
British accountants
21st-century British landowners
Nicholas